Emilio Gavira (born 14 December 1964 in Fuengirola, Málaga Province) is a Spanish actor. The youngest of 6, he lived his life in Málaga and Alcázar de San Juan (Ciudad Real, Spain).

He is the son of Ignacio Gavira and Carmén Tomás and the brother of Ignacio Gavira (junior), Miguel Gavira, Gema Gavira, Carlos Gavira and Humberto Gavira.

He began show business as an opera singer (baritone). After that, he starred in his first major movie: El Milagro de P. Tinto as one of the aliens. Soon after that, he starred in other movies such as: Rompetechos in La Gran Aventura de Mortadelo y Filemón and its sequel, El Gran Zambini, El puente de San Luis Rey and Camino.  His recent film appearance was Blancanieves and was later nominated for a Goya Award for Best Actor.  His television appearance included Agente 700 (Agent 700), Manos a la obra and ¡Ala... Dina! Y He also appeared in theatricals including Carmen (1998), Los misterios de la ópera (2000), Pelo de tormenta by Francisco Nieva and recently  (Divine Words) with the Centro Dramático Nacional company and Henry VIII and the Schism of England with the Compañía Nacional de Teatro Clásico (National Theatrical Classic Company).

He won Best Actor on 6th edition of Festival Internacional de Cine de Gáldar.

References

External links
Emilio Gavira's official web page

1964 births
Living people
People from Fuengirola
Spanish male film actors
Spanish male stage actors
Spanish male television actors
Male actors from Castilla–La Mancha
20th-century Spanish male actors
21st-century Spanish male actors